Los Rompe Discotekas is a 2006 compilation album by Héctor el Father. This album was released under the Roc-A-Fella Records label and under contract with Jay-Z. Popular singles include "Here We Go Yo" by Héctor el Father featuring Jay-Z, "Yomo Dele" by Yomo featuring Fat Joe, and "El Teléfono" by Héctor el Father and Wisin & Yandel. The album has sold over one million copies. A remixed version of the album was released as El Rompe Discoteka: The Mix Album.

Track listing

Chart performance

Sales and certifications

The Mix Album 

El Rompe Discoteka: The Mix Album is a 2007 compilation album by Héctor el Father.

Track listing 
 "Intro"
 "Vamos a Matarnos en la Raya"
 "Maldades"
 "Noche de Travesura"
 "El Rompe Discoteka Mix"
 "Ahora Es Que Es"
 "Hello Mama"
 "Voy Subiendo"
 "Intro Bad Boy"
 "Envidia"
 "Ronca"
 "Tiraera 1"
 "Rumor de Guerra"
 "Tiraera 2/Rumor de Guerra"
 "No Mames Guey"
 "Mirándonos"
 "Interlude"
 "Tú Quieres Duro"
 "Te Vas"
 "Sola"
 "El Rompe Discoteka"
 "Bad Boy Remix 'La Tiraera'"
 "Romantiqueo Remix"

References 

Reggaeton compilation albums
2006 compilation albums
Héctor el Father albums
Roc-A-Fella Records compilation albums
Albums produced by Luny Tunes